The 2018 S.League season is Tampines Rovers's 23rd season at the top level of Singapore football and 73rd year in existence as a football club. The club will also compete in the Singapore League Cup, Singapore Cup, Singapore Community Shield and the AFC Cup.

Key events

Pre-season
On 9/12/2017, it was announced that the team had signed 15 players in the preparation for the 2018 AFC Champions Leagues qualifier against Bali United.

On 25/12/2017, ESPN FC reported that Jordan Webb rebutted the chance to join Portugal League 2 team as he wanted to work with Rabb.

On 12/1/2018, it was reported that Jordan Webb & Ryutaro Megumi will miss the Tampines' ACL playoff due to injury.

On 28/2/2018, Rabb confirmed that Shannon Stephen will be out of the season due to a ligament injury.

Squad

Sleague Squad

Coaching staff

Transfers

Pre-season transfers

In

Out

Note 1: Rafiq Tajudin was initially promoted to the Sleague before being deregistered.

Note 2: Madhu Mohana initially moved to Malaysia before being released and signed with the Stags for the rest of season.

Note 3: Hafiz Sujad initially moved to Malaysia with JDT II before being released and signed with the Stags for the rest of season.

Retained

Extension

Promoted

Trial

Mid-season transfers

In

Out

Extension

Friendlies

Pre-Season Friendly

Team statistics

Appearances and goals

Competitions

Overview

Singapore Premier League

AFC Champions League

Qualifying play-off

AFC Cup

Group Match

Singapore Cup

Tampines Rovers lost 4-3 on aggregate.

See also 
 2017 Tampines Rovers FC season

References

Tampines Rovers FC
Tampines Rovers FC seasons